Jorge Garretón (2 April 1899 – 19 August 1935) was a Chilean fencer. He competed in the team sabre event at the 1928 Summer Olympics.

References

1899 births
1935 deaths
Chilean male sabre fencers
Olympic fencers of Chile
Fencers at the 1928 Summer Olympics